Malaysia competed in the 1995 Southeast Asian Games held in Chiang Mai, Thailand from 9 to 17 December 1995.

Medal summary

Medals by sport

Medallists

Football

Men's tournament
Group A

Women's tournament
Group stage

Gold medal match

References

1995
Nations at the 1995 Southeast Asian Games